Nuclear Safety Commissions are governmental nuclear power and materials watchdogs and may refer to:

 Canadian Nuclear Safety Commission
 Japanese Nuclear Safety Commission